Pioneer House High School is a coeducational special school located in the Northern Moor area of Manchester, England.

It is a free school that was established on  1 September 2017 and is sponsored by the Prospere Learning Trust.

Pioneer House High School admits pupils aged 11 to 19 with Complex Cognitive Difficulties.

References

External links
Pioneer House High School official website

Special schools in Manchester
Free schools in England
Educational institutions established in 2017
2017 establishments in England
Special secondary schools in England